Dalton is a district of Huddersfield, West Yorkshire in England, approximately one mile east of the town centre between Moldgreen, Rawthorpe and Kirkheaton.

Located in a small valley it is mostly housing, with a small number of engineering firms to the north-west, surrounded by farmland used in the production of milk.

Germaine Lindsay, one of the suicide bombers involved in the 7 July 2005 London bombings, had lived in the area following his arrival from Jamaica aged five.

History
Dalton was listed in the Domesday Book of 1086. This tax-motivated survey commissioned by William the Conqueror listed landholdings and resources. However, unlike other areas surrounding Huddersfield, Dalton was not listed as `waste', meaning uncultivated or unusable land, and there was economic activity. A plough was being used and the land was worth ten shillings.

Sir William Fleming III seems to have been interested in farming, for he held himself the manor farm at Wath, farmed for him by Hugh Bacon and his son, Adam Bacon. He also held himself the smaller farm at Dalton near Huddersfield

Sport
Currently, the Edgerton & Dalton Cricket Club play at the ground the end of Dalton Fold Road. They are in the Huddersfield Cricket League. 

The Moldgreen Amateur Rugby League team play at the DRAM (Dalton, Rawthorpe And Moldgreen) Centre fields off Ridgeway in Dalton.

See also
Listed buildings in Huddersfield (Dalton Ward)

References

Areas of Huddersfield